Ajman Club were the champions of the 2016-17 UAE Division 1.

As of 2016–17 the league features 12 sides who play each once for a total of 11 games each. The top two sides gain promotion to the Pro-League, there is no longer relegation as the UAE Division One Group B League stopped playing in 2012.

Stadia and locations

''Note: Table lists clubs in alphabetical order.

Personnel and kits

Note: Flags indicate national team as has been defined under FIFA eligibility rules. Players may hold more than one non-FIFA nationality.

League table

References

Division 1
UAE